The Pennsylvania-New Jersey League was a six–team Independent level baseball minor league that played in the 1908 season. As the name implies, the Pennsylvania-New Jersey League featured franchises based in New Jersey and Pennsylvania. The Pennsylvania–New Jersey League permanently folded after the 1908 season.

History
The Pennsylvania–New Jersey League formed as Independent level minor league that played in 1908. 

The 1908 Pennsylvania–New Jersey League played as a six–team Independent league, beginning play on April 30, 1908. The Pennsylvania–New Jersey League hosted franchises based in Allentown, Pennsylvania, Chester, Pennsylvania, Coatesville, Pennsylvania, Newark, New Jersey, Trenton, New Jersey and York, Pennsylvania.

The York franchise was owned and managed by Y.G. Thomas. York had begun the season playing briefly in the 1908 semi–professional Atlantic League before joining the new Pennsylvania–New Jersey League. Tickets for games at the York Athletic Club Grounds were 25 cents for general admission, with an additional 10 cents for the grandstand. Season tickets were $10.00 for 50 games.

York played their home opening game against Newark on May 2, 1908. Before the game, a parade was held, led by the Spring Garden band and featuring the York and Newark teams. York Mayor Weaver threw out the first pitch. York won the game by a score of 9–4.

Trenton, New Jersey hosted two minor league teams in 1908, as the Trenton Tigers finished 6th in the Class B level Tri-State League with a 54–73 record.

With the league allowing ties, the Pennsylvania–New Jersey League final standings had Chester (8–3–1) and Trenton (7–2–1) in a tie for 1st place, but with Trenton having a higher win percentage. Allentown (6–3–2), Coatesville (5–6–2), York (5–7–0) and Newark (0–10–0) followed in the standings.

The Pennsylvania–New Jersey League permanently folded after the 1908 season.

Pennsylvania–New Jersey League teams

Pennsylvania–New Jersey League overall standings

1908

Notable alumni
Sailor Stroud (1908), Trenton
Steve Yerkes (1908), Chester, MGR

References

Defunct minor baseball leagues in the United States
Baseball leagues in Pennsylvania
Defunct professional sports leagues in the United States
Sports leagues established in 1908
Sports leagues disestablished in 1908
Baseball leagues in New Jersey